Gonzalo José Jaque (born 5 December 1996) is an Argentine professional footballer who plays as a midfielder for Almagro.

Career
San Lorenzo were Jaque's first senior club. They allowed him to depart on loan in August 2017, with Primera B Metropolitana side Defensores de Belgrano temporarily signing Jaque. He made his professional debut on 13 September versus Acassuso, prior to netting his first goal against Deportivo Español in November. In total, Jaque featured thirty-four times as the club won promotion to Primera B Nacional. His loan was subsequently extended for a further season on 22 July 2018. He returned to San Lorenzo in June 2019, before signing with Almagro days after.

Career statistics
.

References

External links

1996 births
Living people
People from José C. Paz Partido
Argentine footballers
Association football midfielders
Argentine Primera División players
Primera B Metropolitana players
Primera Nacional players
San Lorenzo de Almagro footballers
Defensores de Belgrano footballers
Club Almagro players
Sportspeople from Buenos Aires Province